Tizza or Tizzà may refer to:

People
 Marco Tizza (born 1992), Italian cyclist
 Tizza Covi (born 1971), Italian director

Places
 Tizza, Algeria, hill in Tlemcen Province
 Tizza, Ghana
 Torra di Tizzà, Sartène, Corsica